Wyskok may refer to the following places in Poland:
Wyskok, Lower Silesian Voivodeship (south-west Poland)
Wyskok, Warmian-Masurian Voivodeship (north Poland)